Raúl Eduardo Celis Montt (born 5 September 1962) is a Chilean lawyer who is member of the Chilean Constitutional Convention.

Before being constituent, he was linked to the business world. In 2010, he was appointed by the president Sebastián Piñera as intendant of the Valparaíso Region.

Early life
He is the son of Raúl Celis Cornejo, who was the last Valparaíso Region intendant appointed by Augusto Pinochet's dictatorship. Similarly, he is the brother of deputy Andrés Celis Montt.

Celis Montt attended Saint Dominic School and The Mackay School in Vina del Mar. Later, he entered the Valparaíso campus of the University of Chile (current University of Valparaíso or «UV»), where he obtained his Bachelor of Arts in laws. Years later he was Dean of the UV Law School.

Since 1988 he has been a lawyer and comptroller at the University of Playa Ancha. In addition, he is a member of the Editorial Board of El Mercurio de Valparaíso, vice president of the Valparaíso Bar Association and arbitrator judge of the Mediation and Arbitration Center of the Valparaíso Chamber of Commerce.

Political career
In 1984, Celis Montt began his career joining the National Union Movement, in which he was vice president of the youth branch. Later, he was a founding member of Renovación Nacional (RN). In that party he has been National Councilor and president of the Viña del Mar-Concón communal section.

In 2001, his party presented him as a candidate for the 14th District (Vina and Concón), but before the election Celis Montt decided to withdraw his candidacy.

On 11 March 2010, he was appointed by Sebastián Piñera as intendant of the Valparaíso Region. He remained in office until the end of Piñera's presidency on 11 March 2014.

In January 2021, he ran as a candidate representing to Vamos por Chile for a seat the Chilean Constitutional Convention. On 18 May 2021, he was elected with 4,14% of the votes.

References

External links
 Profile at Chile Constituyente

Living people
1962 births
20th-century Chilean lawyers
21st-century Chilean politicians
National Renewal (Chile) politicians
Members of the Chilean Constitutional Convention
The Mackay School alumni
University of Valparaíso alumni
People from Viña del Mar
21st-century Chilean lawyers